Buggy Run is a racing video game for the Master System. published by Sega in 1993. The game incorporates two different types of gameplay, one for single player and one for two player.

Gameplay
In the single player mode, the player races other opponents on a large racing track displayed in a pseudo-3D angle. Before starting the race, the player goes to a garage to purchase parts needed to upgrade the car. The object to win is to get the player's racing car to cross the finishing line first in the last lap. The prize money the player wins, will help fund additional car parts for the next race. In the two player mode, the player races the opposing player on a small racing track displayed in a top-down 2D angle. The rules for winning as almost the same, but players can battle each other while racing. Race tracks take place in four different types of environments including green, water, snow and magma zones.

Reception

References

External links

1993 video games
Racing video games
Master System games
Master System-only games
Video games developed in Japan